"True Love" is a popular song written by American songwriter Cole Porter, published in 1956. The song was introduced by Bing Crosby and Grace Kelly in the musical film High Society. "True Love" was nominated for the Academy Award for Best Original Song. Kelly's contribution on the record is relatively minor, duetting with Crosby on only the final chorus. Nonetheless, the single is co-credited to her.

Background
The Crosby-Kelly version, accompanied by Johnny Green's MGM studio orchestra using a romantic arrangement by Conrad Salinger, was a hit single, peaking at number four in the United Kingdom, number three in Australia and number one in the Netherlands.

Recordings that charted
 Richard Chamberlain released a cover of the song as a single in 1963; it peaked at number 30 in the United Kingdom. 
 A version by Shakin' Stevens from his 1988 album A Whole Lotta Shaky reached number 23 in the UK. 
 In 1993, English musicians Elton John and Kiki Dee recorded the song as an adult contemporary duet for John's album Duets; the single reached number two on the UK Singles Chart and Irish Singles Chart, number four in Belgium, number seven in Iceland, number 12 in Canada and number 56 in the United States.

Other recordings
Other versions to achieve success include:
 A version of the song by Jane Powell out at the same time as the Crosby–Kelly version was also popular. 
 Elvis Presley cut a version of "True Love" that was featured on his successful album Loving You from 1957. 
 Ricky Nelson included a version of the song on his 1957 debut album Ricky. 
 Dean Martin recorded the song for his 1960 LP This Time I'm Swingin'!.
 In 1961 Patsy Cline covered the song on her second studio album, Patsy Cline Showcase. 
 Shelley Fabares cut a version of the song on her album Shelley! released in 1962.
 Al Hirt released a version on his 1962 album, Trumpet and Strings. 
 The Everly Brothers recorded a version for their 1962 album Instant Party without any commercial success. 
 A version by Nancy Sinatra was released as a single in 1965.
 Jack Jones, 1965, as the closing tune for There's Love and There's Love and There's Love, an album of romance classics arranged by Nelson Riddle; 
 The song has also featured on a number of albums cut by Connie Francis.
 A version of "True Love" is on the 1974 album I'm Leaving It All Up to You by Donny and Marie Osmond.
 A version by George Harrison done in a blues rock style, from his 1976 album Thirty Three & 1/3, was released as the album's third single in 1977.
 The short-lived 1980s band Oasis recorded a version on their one album, Oasis, in 1984. 
 Anne Murray recorded a cover of the song for her album Croonin' (1993). 
 Neil Diamond covered the song for his 1998 album The Movie Album: As Time Goes By. 
 Deana Martin recorded “True Love” on her 2013 album Destination Moon as a duet with her father, Dean Martin, who originally recorded the song for his 1960 album This Time I'm Swingin'!.
 Benny Anderssons orkester on the live CD BAO på turné in 2006.
 Harry Connick Jr. recorded the song for his 2019 album True Love: A Celebration of Cole Porter.

Charts

Weekly charts
Bing Crosby and Grace Kelly version

Richard Chamberlain version

Shakin' Stevens version

Elton John and Kiki Dee version

Year-end charts
Bing Crosby and Grace Kelly version

Elton John and Kiki Dee version

Certifications

In popular culture
 "True Love" is the name of a yacht on which two of the characters honeymoon in the play The Philadelphia Story, on which the musical is based. Bing Crosby later owned a 55-foot Constellation'' yacht which he named the "True Love".
 On the episode of "The Muppet Show" with special guest Cheryl Ladd, Miss Piggy and Link Hogthrob sing "True Love" as a duet in the opening number.  In their performance, they are in the jungle surrounded by wild animals such as a monkey, an alligator, and many birds who also sing portions of the song.

References

1956 songs
1961 singles
1963 singles
1965 singles
1976 singles
1988 singles
1993 singles
Songs written by Cole Porter
Song recordings produced by Narada Michael Walden
MGM Records singles
Dark Horse Records singles
The Rocket Record Company singles
Bing Crosby songs
Elton John songs
Kiki Dee songs
George Harrison songs
Richard Chamberlain songs
Patsy Cline songs
Shelley Fabares songs
Neil Diamond songs
Al Hirt songs
Shakin' Stevens songs
Songs from High Society (1956 film)
Male–female vocal duets
Ricky Nelson songs
1950s ballads